Nanocassiope is a genus of crabs in the family Xanthidae, containing the following species:

 Nanocassiope alcocki (Rathbun, 1902)
 Nanocassiope grandulipes (Sakai, 1939)
 Nanocassiope melanodactylus (A. Milne Edwards, 1868)
 Nanocassiope oblonga Davie, 1995
 Nanocassiope polita (Rathbun, 1894)
 Nanocassiope tridentata Davie, 1995

References

Xanthoidea